Yubo Ruan(), born in Beijing in 1996, is a tech entrepreneur and venture capitalist. He is the founder and CEO of 8 Decimal Capital, a venture capital investment firm focusing on early stage fintech.

Biography
From 2008 to 2012,  Ruan developed and upgraded the smart piggy bank system.

In 2017, he served as the co-founder of Skylight Investment, backed by New Oriental and Taiyou Fund.

In 2017, he started 8 Decimal Capital with an AUM of over $60 million

Patents 
  "Multifunctional saving pot," December 11, 2013. 
  "Saving pot system based on communication and communication method of saving pot system," January 7, 2015.
  "Coin storage device," February 11, 2015.

References

Living people
Businesspeople from Beijing
Chinese venture capitalists
1996 births